The Catholic Church in the United States comprises ecclesiastical territories called dioceses, eparchies, and ordinariates led by prelate ordinaries known as bishops. Each bishop is assigned to a cathedral from which he is pastor to the people of his jurisdiction. Some dioceses also have a co-cathedral or a pro-cathedral. This is a complete list of the 193 cathedrals of the Latin Church and the 20 cathedrals of the Eastern Catholic Churches in the United States.

Latin Church

Personal ordinariate

Former Latin Church cathedrals

Eastern Catholic cathedrals

Ukrainian Greek Catholic cathedrals

The Ukrainian Greek Catholic Church in the United States is organized into a metropolia (or province) consisting of a metropolitan archeparchy and three suffragan eparchies.

Ruthenian Catholic cathedrals

The Ruthenian Catholic Church in the United States is organized into the sui iuris Province of Pittsburgh, consisting of a metropolitan archeparchy and three suffragan eparchies. The eparchies also serve the faithful of other Byzantine Rite Churches without established hierarchies in the United States, namely those of the Albanian, Belarusian, Bulgarian, Croatian, Greek, Hungarian, Italo-Albanian, Macedonian, Russian, and Slovakian Byzantine Catholic Churches.

Eastern Catholic cathedrals of eparchies immediately subject to the Holy See

The following particular churches of various Eastern Rites are not suffragan to Metropolitan sees, but are instead exempt, i.e. immediately subject to the Holy See, while they remain part of their respective patriarchal, major archiepiscopal or other rite- & tradition-specific particular Churches.

Former cathedrals

See also
List of Catholic churches in the United States
List of cathedrals in the United States
List of basilicas#North American & Central American Basilicas
Catholic Marian churches
:Category:Roman Catholic churches in the United States (including sub-categories for shrines, cathedrals,  and former churches) – churches are listed by state, territory, or D.C.
List of Coptic Orthodox Churches in the United States
List of the Catholic bishops of the United States
List of the Catholic dioceses of the United States

References

External links
United States Conference of Catholic Bishops
List of all Cathedrals in the United States by GCatholic.org

 

Cathedrals, Catholic in the United States
United States, Catholic
Unit